SM City San Pablo is the 38th shopping mall owned by SM Prime Holdings. It is the 2nd SM Supermall in the province of Laguna.

Design and interiors
SM City San Pablo has two levels and has over 100 shops. It has a semi-eye shaped atrium for events. The mall's atrium has perforated ceiling. SM City San Pablo's design team includes Design Associates Inc., mall designer; Jose Siao Ling and Associates, architects; DA Abcede and Associates, project manager; and DDT Konstract, general contractor.

History
As early as 2008, SM Prime Holdings was planning to open SM Supercenter San Pablo (a downsized SM mall, originally) but this was shot down due to political pressures. After several attempts to build a similar establishment, SM Prime Holdings was given its go signal in July 2008 to push its construction ahead.

It was expected to be completed in August 2010, but due to strategic location and growing demands for commercial establishments in San Pablo, it was upgraded into SM City San Pablo on April 28, 2010.

The mall opened on October 1, 2010. The cinema commenced operations on December 3, 2010, ahead of the 36th Metro Manila Film Festival.

Recent expansions

Main Building (2010)

An event venue with two floors is styled like a semi-eye-shaped atrium. It houses tenants like The SM Store and SM Supermarket.

Expansion (2016)
On October 28, 2016, the Cyberzone was completed and opened to the public. Along with it additional stores also opened including Yellow Cab, Starbucks, Oxygen and Mesa.

A new passport office of the Department of Foreign Affairs was inaugurated in October 2018 at the mall's second level.

BPO (TBA)
As of August 1, 2017, the BPO is still under construction. It can be seen near the mall's facade.

Accidents/Incidents
In July 2010, during the mall's construction, 2 construction workers died and 7 others were injured when a scaffolding, on which three layers of metal pipes were also piled up, collapsed and hit the victims on site. This accident caused the delay of the mall's completion and opening.
On July 16, 2014, the mall's facade was damaged due to Typhoon Glenda (Rammasun) that passed through Laguna.
On June 25, 2016, a shootout happened at Blue Magic, a gift shop. It was later reported that the gunman escaped the mall without the guards noticing.
On May 3, 2022, a criminal group called "termite gang" invaded the mall by accessing one of the nearby road's drainage system, no items were stolen in the incident.

See also
SM Supermalls
San Pablo City, Laguna
Laguna Province

References

Shopping malls in Laguna (province)
Shopping malls established in 2010
SM Prime
Buildings and structures in San Pablo, Laguna